Romantics & Mystics is the fifth album by Steve Bell.  The album won the Juno Award for Best Gospel Album of the Year at the Juno Awards of 1998.  The song "Moon Over Birkenau" later received a 2008 GMA Canada nomination for Instrumental Song Of The Year.

Related
Song Book, Romantics & Mystics (1997)
my all romantic sms, messages, text all article please read it here

Track listing
 "Dark Night of the Soul" - 4:41
 "Here by the Water" - 4:54
 "Remember Me" - 3:53
 "Alone Tonight" - 3:58
 "Drumheller Circle" - 2:12
 "All for a Loveless Night" - 4:04
 "Moon Over Birkenau'" - 5:45
 "Lament for a Nation" - 4:34
 "Keeping Vigil" - 4:53
 "This is Love" - 4:40
 "Can I Go With You" - 4:27
 "Let's Do It Again" - 5:06

Words and music by Steve Bell except "Here by the Water" and "Keeping Vigil" by Jim Croegaert.

References 

Steve Bell (musician) albums
1997 albums
Juno Award for Contemporary Christian/Gospel Album of the Year albums